SMS Prinz Eitel Friedrich may refer to:

 , a German auxiliary cruiser taken over by the US and commissioned as  during the First World War
 , an unfinished  built for the German Navy during the First World War

German Navy ship names